Contest of Champions II is a five-issue comic book limited series published from September to November 1999 by Marvel Comics. The series was written by Chris Claremont and pencilled by Oscar Jimenez and Michael Ryan. The series is unrelated to the original limited series of the same name — Contest of Champions — published in 1982.

Plot summary 
A group of Earth's heroes are invited by an apparently benevolent race to participate in a series of contests against one another in exchange for advanced technology. This, however, is a ruse staged by the alien race the Brood. The Brood Queen plans to absorb the powers of the strongest heroes and channel them into the captive mutant heroine Rogue, to whom the Brood Queen has transferred her consciousness using Rogue's mutant power, subsequently using the winning heroes as hosts for Brood embryos for the new invasion of Earth.

Courtesy of microscopic nanites, all the heroes (with the exception of Iron Man, whose armor's automatic life support systems protected him from infection) are drugged, and become indifferent to everything except the contest, unable to process the anomalies in the situation facing them. Although the losing heroes are allegedly returned to Earth, Iron Man's first victory allows him to confirm that the departing teleporters lack the strength to return the subject to Earth. After Iron Man loses his second match against X-Force, he learns that the heroes are actually teleported to a different part of the ship to either destroy each other or be hunted by various animals. After encountering Psylocke, he is able to use his resources to reprogram the nanobots and use them to cure the other losing heroes, he and Psylocke forming a strike force to determine their location and gather the other heroes together to oppose the Brood's scheme. The Brood Queen's plan is eventually disrupted by the hero Hawkeye, who was overlooked in the early stages of the contest, and Iron Man, who leads several defeated heroes against the Brood. The Brood are defeated and Rogue is cured by heroine Ms. Marvel, who makes the Brood Queen withdraw from Rogue's body by convincing the Queen that she will kill Rogue if she does not.

List of conflicts

Collected editions

Footnotes